Pangi is a community in the Democratic Republic of the Congo.  It is the administrative center of Pangi Territory in Maniema Province.

References

Sources

Populated places in Maniema